VTAR Institute, abbreviated as VTAR, is a private vocational college located at Kuala Lumpur, Malaysia.

VTAR Institute was formerly known as Institute Jayadiri which was founded in 1992 as a community project of Koperasi Jayadiri Malaysia Berhad and conducts its classes in some shoplots in Old Klang Road. Then in 2000 Institute Jayadiri was relocated to Wisma MCA and renamed Kojadi Institute. In 2014, the president of MCA approved the relocation of Kojadi Institute to Tunku Abdul Rahman University College in Setapak, Kuala Lumpur in the hope that this new premise will have a more conducive environment for the students.

VTAR is the first private institute in Malaysia received the approval from Energy Commission (ST) to offer Wireman Course (PW2). In 2011, VTAR was rated 4 star rating from Jabatan Pembangunan Kemahiran (JPK).

On 17 March 2015, VTAR signs a memorandum of understanding (MOU) with TransWorld University (TWU), Taiwan to allow graduates from Beauty Therapy or Hairdressing further studies in this university.

On 27 September 2019, VTAR is an approved UK's Highfield Qualifications training centre.

History
VTAR was formed in 1990. Initially, it conducted academic programmes from certificate level until diploma level and vocational programmes up until certificate level. It also collaborate with Universiti Tunku Abdul Rahman to offer Foundation In Arts that can further study into UTAR degree programmes. Academic programmes were accredited by the Malaysian Qualifications Agency (MQA) whilst the vocational programmes were accredited by Jabatan Pembangunan Kemahiran (JPK), Kementerian Sumber Manusia.

In mid-2011, VTAR phased out the academic programmes to concentrate fully on vocational programmes. This change of focus is in line with the government's call to produce more skilled workers.  Students who pass the vocational courses will be awarded the Sijil Kemahiran Malaysia (SKM) which accredited by JPK.

Departments
There are two departments under VTAR Institute:

Department SKM – Engineering
Sijil Kemahiran Malaysia (SKM) Electronic Equipment Level 2 & 3
Sijil Kemahiran Malaysia (SKM) Electrical Installation and Maintenance Level 2 & 3

Department SKM – Beauty Therapy
Sijil Kemahiran Malaysia (SKM) Beauty Therapy Level 1 & 2
Diploma in Hairdressing

Department SKM – Automotive
Diploma Kemahiran Malaysia (DKM) Automotive Technology Level 4 - In collaboration with Tekat Academy

Department SKM – Furniture Technology
Sijil Kemahiran Malaysia (SKM) Furniture Production Operation Level 2 & 3 - In collaboration with Malaysian Furniture Council (MFC)

Partner Institution
 Malaysia
Universiti Tunku Abdul Rahman
 Taiwan
TransWorld University

References

Colleges in Malaysia
Vocational colleges in Malaysia
Universities and colleges in Kuala Lumpur
Educational institutions established in 1990
1990 establishments in Malaysia
Technical universities and colleges in Malaysia
Engineering universities and colleges in Malaysia